Copa District is one of five districts of the province Cajatambo in Peru.

Geography 
The Huayhuash mountain range traverses the district. Some of the highest mountains are listed below:

 Auxilio
 Jullutahuarco
 Rajucollota
 Rasac
 Sarapo
 Huacrish

Administrative Division

Village centres 

 Urban
 Copa, with 481 inhabitants.
 Huayllapa, with 323 inhabitants.
 Rural

Ethnic groups 
The people in the province are mainly indigenous citizens of Quechua descent. Quechua is the language 38.52% of the population learnt to speak in childhood, 61.36% of the residents started speaking using the Spanish language (2007 Peru Census).

See also 
 Sarapococha

References